Karmveer Choudhary  sometimes referred as Karamveer Chaudhary (born 24 July 1963, Jhunjhunu District) is an Indian actor and motivational speaker, best known for his works in Hindi cinema and Indian television.

Life and career 
He started his career with Rajasthani Cinema (regional cinema), where he has appeared in more than 20 films as the villain. He came into prominence after being cast in the 2016 movie Sultan, where he acted as a government sports officer.  He also played Aamir Khan's father in Dangal. Choudhary appeared on the television show Badho Bahu as Kailash Singh Ahlawat (Lucky's Tau Ji) aired on & TV during 2016–18. Prior to his acting career, he stood for election as a Samajwadi Party candidate in 2003 from Mavli constituency in Udaipur. He appeared on the television show Kuch Rang Pyar Ke Aise Bhi as Khatri (Main Villain), aired on Sony TV (India) during 2016 - 17 and Kya Qusoor Hai Amala Ka? as Hemraj, aired on Star Plus (2017). He also appeared in Mere Brother Ki Dulhan, with Katrina Kaif (2011). He was awarded for Best Villain at the Jaipur Film Festival in 2014. He has also done TV Commercials for Kurkure in 2009, Symphony cooler in 2013, Pepsi in 2015 and IDFC Bank in 2016. He played a strong character as Pandit Ji in Waarrior Savitri (2016). He played the main villain in Gauraiya (2015).

Filmography

Films

Television

Web series

See also 

List of Bollywood actors
List of Indian television actors

References

External links

Living people
Male actors from Rajasthan
Indian male film actors
Male actors in Hindi cinema
Indian male television actors
1963 births
People from Jhunjhunu district